Sven Johan Reksten (born 12 September 1949 in Bergen, Norway), also known as Dennis Reksten, is a Norwegian musician, composer and music producer, known from bands like Elektrisk Regn.

Biography 
Reksten has been part of the Bergen rock scene for almost 50 years, and has released the albums Steinbyen (1982), Kropp Uten Sjel (1984), Stein Igjen (2002) with Elektrisk Regn, in addition to the EP Hilsen El-Regn (1987). He also wrote the song «Oslo By», a combat song when the Bergen football team Brann met the Oslo team Lyn in the Norwegian Cup final 2004. Reksten has been engaged in the rock club Garage since its opening in the late 1980s, arranging concerts in this Bergen rock venue.

Discography 
With Elektrisk Regn
1982: Steinbyen (Apollon Records)
1984: Kropp Uten Sjel (Robot Records)
1987: Hilsen El Regn EP (Robot Records)
2002: Stein Igjen (Self Release)

With Zimmerman
1982: LP 4 (Notabene Records)
2007: Till You Know What I Mean (JOA Music)

With Enslaved
2001: Monumension (Osmose Productions)
2003: Below The Lights (Osmose Productions)

Honours and mentions
On the 2018 album This Is My Dinner Sun Kil Moon sings a verse about Reksten.
In 2019 Reksten received the King's Medal of Merit.

References

External links 
Hyllet rockebestefar at Bergens Tidende 

Norwegian male singers
Norwegian guitarists
Norwegian male guitarists
Musicians from Bergen
Norwegian new wave musicians
1949 births
Living people
Recipients of the King's Medal of Merit